Asbestopluma is a genus of sponges belonging to the family Cladorhizidae.

The genus has cosmopolitan distribution. They are typically found in deep water, however it is possible to find them in shallow water caves, as some have been observed in the Trois Pépés cave at La Ciotat (a commune in Marseille, France).

Species:

Asbestopluma agglutinans 
Asbestopluma anisoplacochela 
Asbestopluma belgicae

References

Cladorhizidae
Sponge genera